Abell 2744 Y1 is a galaxy located in the Abell 2744 galaxy cluster, 13 billion light years away in the Sculptor constellation. It is 2,300 light years in diameter, 50 times smaller than the Milky Way galaxy, but producing 10 times more stars. The galaxy was discovered in July 2014 by an international team led by astronomers from the Instituto de Astrofísica de Canarias (IAC) and La Laguna University (ULL) as part of the Frontier Fields program with the help of NASA’s Spitzer and Hubble Space Telescopes.

References

Galaxies
Dwarf galaxies
Sculptor (constellation)